A literary circle  is a small group of students, scholars or writers who gather together to discuss a piece of literature in depth.

Famous or noteworthy examples include:

 The Socrates School
 The Bloomsbury Group
 The Dymock Poets
 The Algonquin Roundtable
 The Inklings
 Stratford-on-Odéon
 The Factory
 The El Floridita literary circle, which included Ernest Hemingway
 The Mutual Admiration Society
 The Whitechapel Boys
 The Streatham Worthies
 The Budh Sabha

See also
 Literary society

References

External links 

Literary circles
Literary societies